The Big 12 Championship Game is a college football game held by the Big 12 Conference between the best and the second-best Big 12 team. The game was played each year since the conference's formation in 1996 until 2010 and returned during the 2017 season. From 1996 to 2010, the championship game pitted the Big 12 North Division champion against the South Division champion in a game held after the regular season was completed. From 2017 onward, the game features the two teams with the best conference records.

In the first eight Big 12 championship games, from 1996 to 2003, the divisions split four games each, with the north champion winning in every odd-numbered year and the south champion winning in every even-numbered year. However, the North division champion did not win after No. 13 Kansas State's 35–7 upset victory over No. 1 Oklahoma in 2003.

The game will be played at AT&T Stadium in Arlington, Texas until at least 2025.

History
The first championship game was played after the 1996 regular season, the first year of play for the Big 12 (which was created from the merger of the Big Eight Conference and four teams from the Southwest Conference). Like the SEC Championship Game (which has been played since 1992), the game matched the winners of the conference's two six-team divisions. The championship game was held at several sites within the Big 12 states, with Arrowhead Stadium in Kansas City, Missouri, hosting more often than any other venue.
 
The 2008 Big 12 Championship Game was notable for the controversy over choosing the South Division representative. The Oklahoma Sooners, Texas Longhorns, and Texas Tech Red Raiders all finished with identical records and had each recorded a win and loss among one another. The Sooners earned a berth to the title game because they had the highest Bowl Championship Series ranking of the three at the time of selection. Oklahoma defeated the Missouri Tigers and earned a berth in the 2009 BCS National Championship Game.

From 2009 through 2013, the game was scheduled to be played at Cowboys Stadium, now known as AT&T Stadium, in Arlington, Texas. During June 2010, however, Nebraska and Colorado announced that they would leave the Big 12 for other conferences (the Big Ten Conference and the Pac-12 Conference, respectively) in 2011. Because NCAA rules at the time required that a conference have 12 members in order to stage a football championship game that was exempt from NCAA limits on regular-season games, the conference dropped the championship game following the 2010 season. During this time, Oklahoma and Texas had expressed that a conference title game hurt the chances of the conference to have a representative in the BCS National Championship Game, and now the College Football Playoff, which started in 2014.

In December 2014 after completing the first season with the College Football Playoff, Baylor and TCU both finished the season with an 8–1 conference record and were declared co-champions by the conference despite Baylor's head-to-head win over TCU. When the selection committee met to set the teams for the first playoff, both Baylor and TCU were overlooked in favor of teams that competed in and won their conference's championship game, leaving the Big 12 out of the playoffs. This led to criticism of how the Big 12 determined its champion.

In April 2015, legislation was developed by the ACC and the Big 12 to deregulate conference championship games. It was announced by NCAA officials as being expected to pass in time for the start of the 2016 season.  The legislation passed on January 14, 2016 allowing a conference with fewer than twelve teams to stage a championship game between the top two teams, so long as they play a round-robin schedule. In late 2016, the Big 12 decided to bring back the championship game in 2017 after a seven-year-long gap of having no conference championship game.

Results
Below are the results from all Big 12 Championship Games played. The winning team appears in bold font, on a background of their primary team color. Rankings are from the AP Poll released prior to the game.

1996–2010
Below are conference championship games when the Big 12 was separated by divisions and the division champions would meet in the conference championship.

2017–present
Below are conference championship games after the conference began playing the championship game again in 2017. The first and second place finishers in the conference play for the championship.

Results by team
Fourteen different teams have played for the Big 12 in its existence including all four former members. Of these teams, only Kansas, Texas Tech and West Virginia have never played in the Big 12 Championship game.

Current members

Former members

Common matchups
Matchups that have occurred more than once:

Division era

Game records

Source:

See also
 List of NCAA Division I FBS conference championship games

References